The Anchorage is a historic home in Easton, Talbot County, Maryland, USA. It is a five-part house with a large -story center section and small hyphens and wings. It has a 2-story Greek Revival porch supported by four Doric columns. The main section was built around 1810, with the wings probably added during the 1830s. Also on the property is a log smokehouse and a windmill. The Lloyd family of Wye House bought the property in 1831 and one of Governor Edward Lloyd's daughters and her husband went to live in it.

It was listed on the National Register of Historic Places in 1974.

References

External links
, including photo in 1973, at Maryland Historical Trust

Easton, Maryland
Houses in Talbot County, Maryland
Greek Revival houses in Maryland
Houses completed in 1810
Houses on the National Register of Historic Places in Maryland
National Register of Historic Places in Talbot County, Maryland